Onofrio Catacchio (born 28 October 1964) is an Italian comics artist.

Onofrio Catacchio was born in Bari in 1964; he currently lives and works in Bologna.

In 1988 he created the character Stella Rossa, who first appeared in the magazines Fuego and Nova Express , being later collected in volumes published by Granata Press. Kappa Edizioni later reprinted it. For Granata Press he also dramatized and illustrated the Coliandro stories, inspired by works of mystery writer Carlo Lucarelli, re-published by BD editions. As a scriptwriter, he has written Offspring from hell for Andrea Accardi, released in Italy by Kappa Edizioni and in France by Albin Michel.

Since 1995 he has produced various episodes of Nathan Never for Sergio Bonelli Publishing. He dramatized and designed The ballad of Corazza by Wu Ming 2, published by BD/Alta Fedeltà and inserted into the Top Crime anthology by Mondadori. With scripts by Andrea Balzola, he created Freaks’ Farm, a spoof adapted from George Orwell’s novel of a similar title. In 2006 he illustrated stories and stage images from Gaijin!, written by Luigi Bernardi and staged by the Tratto theatre company. With Luigi Bernardi he was also responsible for the creation of "Habemus Fantomas” for the anthology published by Alta Fedeltà.

External links
 Official website

1964 births
Living people
People from Bari
Italian comics artists
Italian comics writers